The 1978 Indiana State Sycamores football team was an American football team that represented Indiana State University as a member of the Missouri Valley Conference (MVC) during the 1978 NCAA Division I-A football season. In their first year under head coach Dick Jamieson, the team compiled an overall record of 3–8 record with a mark of 2–3 in conference play, placing fifth in the MVC.

Schedule

References

Indiana State
Indiana State Sycamores football seasons
Indiana State Sycamores football